The 34th Annual Nickelodeon Kids' Choice Awards ceremony was held on March 13, 2021, at the Barker Hangar in Santa Monica, California with Kenan Thompson serving as host. It aired live on Nickelodeon and in a domestic simulcast with several other ViacomCBS cable networks, and was broadcast live or tape delayed across all of Nickelodeon's international networks.

The ceremony was held with most presenters, winners, and performers in-person, with some appearing virtually due to the ongoing COVID-19 pandemic. The show also featured an interactive fan wall to allow for an audience, and utilized XR technology throughout its broadcast. Justin Bieber performed "Intentions" with Quavo, as well as "Anyone" and "Hold On", the former originally being planned for the previous years' ceremony.

The show set a Guinness World Record for 'Most People Gunged/Slimed Simultaneously Online' with 195 participants. In addition, Millie Bobby Brown became only the second person since Amanda Bynes in 2003 to win both 'Favorite Movie Actress' and 'Favorite TV Actress' within the same ceremony. On March 18, it was announced that BTS set another world record after winning three awards in the ceremony, achieving them the Guinness World Record for 'Most Nickelodeon Kids' Choice Awards blimps won by a music group', with five overall (one each in 2018 and 2020).

A new episode of Danger Force led into the ceremony, while a new episode of Side Hustle served as the lead-out.

Appearances 
The ceremony featured appearances by celebrities including Anthony Anderson, Iain Armitage, Jayden Bartels, Joshua Bassett, Hailey Bieber, Millie Bobby Brown, BTS, Dove Cameron, Terry Crews, Charli D'Amelio, David Dobrik, Robert Downey Jr., Young Dylan, Gal Gadot, Jennifer Garner, Gabrielle Nevaeh Green, Tiffany Haddish, Kim Kardashian, Anna Kendrick, Heidi Klum, Liza Koshy, That Girl Lay Lay, Jules LeBlanc, Darci Lynne, Marsai Martin, Gaten Matarazzo, Lin-Manuel Miranda, Tyler Perry,  Addison Rae, Noah Schnapp, JoJo Siwa, Sofía Vergara, and Finn Wolfhard. Also during the show were iCarly cast members Miranda Cosgrove, Nathan Kress, and Jerry Trainor all reuniting together, and Thompson's onscreen daughters of Kenan, Dani and Dannah Lane. Vice President of the United States, Kamala Harris, also made an appearance during the ceremony.

Performers

Winners and nominees 
The nominees were announced and voting opened on February 2, 2021. Voting ended on March 13, 2021. The winners are listed first, highlighted in boldfaced text.

Movies

Television

Music

Sports

Miscellaneous

Special Recognition

Generation Change 
 Kamala Harris

International 
The following are nominations for awards to be given by Nickelodeon's international networks.

Notes

References

External links 
  (archived)
 

Kids' Choice
Kids' Choice Awards
Kids' Choice Awards
Kids' Choice Awards
Nickelodeon Kids' Choice Awards
Television shows directed by Glenn Weiss